The term liquid chalk, or sharkchalk, refers to several different kinds of chalk:
 liquid-chalk marking pens (with water-soluble ink);
 liquid-chalk mixtures (for athletic use: rock climbing, weightlifting, gymnastics);
 liquid-chalk hobby-craft paints made of cornstarch and food coloring (some with small amounts of flour).
Despite the term, some forms of "liquid chalk" contain no actual chalk.

Liquid gym chalk is a form of chalk that is applied to the hands in liquid form. It is designed to improve grip and reduce the amount of chalk dust created during use. Some benefits of liquid gym chalk include:

 Easy to apply: Liquid chalk can be easily applied to the hands with a brush or applicator, making it less messy than traditional chalk.
 Long-lasting: Liquid chalk dries quickly and forms a bond with the skin, providing a long-lasting grip.
 Reduces chalk dust: Since the chalk is applied in liquid form, it creates less dust than traditional chalk, making it a cleaner option for use in indoor gym environments.
 Can be used in conjunction with gloves or lifting straps: The liquid chalk can be applied to gloves or lifting straps to improve grip, making them more effective.
 Can be used for various activities: Liquid gym chalk can be used for weightlifting, rock climbing, gymnastics, and other activities where a good grip is important.

Sports 
Liquid chalk can be a variation of normal chalk (see: magnesium carbonate) used to improve grip for sports, such as rock climbing, weight lifting, or gymnastics.

Rock climbing 
Rock climbers use liquid chalk to prevent their hands from sweating. It may be used by climbers in situations where powdered chalk is restricted.  It is preferred by athletes because it remains effective longer and leaves less residue on rocks and equipment. Liquid chalk for rock climbers is made from magnesium carbonate. Since liquid chalk does not leave a white residue, it is an environmentally friendly alternative. In five forms of climbing, liquid chalk may prove more useful than powdered chalk.

 Bouldering—Liquid chalk is less likely to wear off the hand on particularly long sequences of moves.
 Competition Climbing—Liquid chalk allows competitive climbers to take fewer chalk breaks, thereby preventing early fatigue.
 Indoor Climbing—Prevents excessive chalk buildup on holds.
 Outdoor Climbing—Chalk deposits on natural rock formations are ecologically harmful, and in many climbing locations, the use of chalk for climbing is strictly forbidden. Liquid chalk requires less material and causes less damage.
 Deep-water soloing—Due to the risk of falling into water involved with deep-water solo climbing, some climbers opt for liquid chalk that allows them to apply chalk to their hands before starting the climb. They place a line of chalk on their forearms to re-chalk during the climb. This reduces the waste of loose chalk and prevents having to dry out a chalk bag.

Other sports 
In other sports, liquid chalk is less beneficial to the athlete, because re-chalking can be done more easily between sets or rounds. However, some gyms require liquid chalk because it leaves less residue on gym equipment. Liquid chalk adheres to the hand better, reducing the need to re-chalk.

Ingredients 
Some liquid-chalk mixtures for climbing are made with magnesium carbonate, colophony, and ethanol or an alcohol that dissolves the colophony and quickly evaporates from the solution (as isopropyl alcohol or ethanol). Sometimes, an additive for aroma is included because of the bad smell of spirit.

Usage 
Sports liquid chalk is sold in bottles. The user takes a small amount into their palms, spreading the chalk onto areas that require grip. The liquid evaporates when it comes into contact with the warmth of a user's hand, leaving behind chalk. Alcohol disrupts the bonds between water molecules, reducing the energy needed to cause evaporation.

See also 
 Glossary of climbing terms
 Climbing
 Bouldering
 Magnesium carbonate

References

Climbing equipment
Alchemical substances